Ismet Štilić (born 31 July 1960) is Bosnian professional football manager and former player.

Playing career
Štilić began his 14-year professional career with hometown club Sloboda Tuzla, making his debut with the first team in 1981. He also played one season for Rudar Prijedor and two for Novi Sad before making a move to Željezničar.

After four years at Željezničar, Štilić moved abroad, where he remained until his retirement. He started with Portuguese club União, appearing in only 17 games in one 1/2 Primeira Liga seasons combined, then scoring 10 goals with Leça as the club got promoted from the Portuguese Second Division. He returned to the Second Division in 1994, appearing for Dragões Sandinenses, after which he retired at the age of 35.

Managerial career
Štilić began working as a manager with former club Željezničar, first with the youth sides then as an assistant to Jiří Plíšek. In early November 2004, Plíšek was sacked and Štilić was appointed as his replacement, going on to act as caretaker for several matches, and eventually returning to the youth team.

On 29 October 2018, Štilić was once again named the assistant manager at Željezničar. From 27 November 2018 to 31 December 2018, Štilić and other Željezničar assistant manager Adin Mulaosmanović were both dual-caretaker managers of the club after Milomir Odović left that position. Both stayed on that position until the club found a new manager which was Amar Osim. He left Željezničar on 31 December 2018.

Personal life
Štilić's son, Semir, is also a professional footballer and a midfielder who currently plays for Željezničar. He also played at Polish club Lech Poznań for several seasons, as well as the Bosnia and Herzegovina national team.

References

External links
Yugoslavia stats at Zerodic

1960 births
Living people
Sportspeople from Tuzla
Association football midfielders
Yugoslav footballers
Bosnia and Herzegovina footballers
FK Sloboda Tuzla players
FK Rudar Prijedor players
RFK Novi Sad 1921 players
FK Željezničar Sarajevo players
C.F. União players
Leça F.C. players
S.C. Dragões Sandinenses players
Yugoslav First League players
Primeira Liga players
Yugoslav expatriate footballers
Expatriate footballers in Portugal
Bosnia and Herzegovina expatriate footballers
Bosnia and Herzegovina football managers
FK Željezničar Sarajevo managers
Premier League of Bosnia and Herzegovina managers
Bosnia and Herzegovina expatriate sportspeople in Portugal